Melpomene (minor planet designation: 18 Melpomene) is a large, bright main-belt asteroid that was discovered by J. R. Hind on 24 June 1852, and named after Melpomenē, the Muse of tragedy in Greek mythology. It is classified as an S-type asteroid and is composed of silicates and metals. The orbital plane is tilted at an angle of 10.1° to the plane of the ecliptic.

Melpomene occulted the star SAO 114159 on 11 December 1978. A possible Melpomenean satellite with a diameter at least 37 km was detected. The satellite candidate received a provisional designation S/1978 (18) 1. In 1988 a search for satellites or dust orbiting this asteroid was performed using the UH88 telescope at the Mauna Kea Observatories, but the effort came up empty. Melpomene was observed with the Hubble Space Telescope in 1993. It was able to resolve the asteroid's slightly elongated shape, but no satellites were detected.

Melpomene has been studied by radar.

References

External links 
 
 

Background asteroids
Melpomene
Melpomene
S-type asteroids (Tholen)
S-type asteroids (SMASS)
18520624

vec:Lista de asteroidi#18 Melpòmene